Carroll v. United States, 354 U.S. 394 (1957), was a case dealing with the appealability of a suppression order issued by the Federal District Court for the District of Columbia for an unlawful warrant under the Fourth Amendment.

In February of 1957, officers arrested Carroll and Stewart on John Doe arrest warrants for violations of local lottery laws. During the detainment, officers conducted a Search Incident to Arrest and seized evidence from their person. They petitioned the District Court for suppression of the evidence on grounds that the warrants were null and void due to the lack of the Constitutionally required probable cause under the Fourth Amendment to the U.S. Constitution. The District Court granted the petition. The Government appeals to the Federal Court of Appeals, which reversed the suppression order.

In a unanimous 9-0 opinion written by Justice Warren, the Supreme Court of the United States reversed the Court of Appeals, stating that:

𝐼𝑡 𝑖𝑠 𝑎𝑥𝑖𝑜𝑚𝑎𝑡𝑖𝑐, 𝑎𝑠 𝑎 𝑚𝑎𝑡𝑡𝑒𝑟 𝑜𝑓 ℎ𝑖𝑠𝑡𝑜𝑟𝑦 𝑎𝑠 𝑤𝑒𝑙𝑙 𝑎𝑠 𝑑𝑜𝑐𝑡𝑟𝑖𝑛𝑒, 𝑡ℎ𝑎𝑡 𝑡ℎ𝑒 𝑒𝑥𝑖𝑠𝑡𝑒𝑛𝑐𝑒 𝑜𝑓 𝑎𝑝𝑝𝑒𝑙𝑙𝑎𝑡𝑒 𝑗𝑢𝑟𝑖𝑠𝑑𝑖𝑐𝑡𝑖𝑜𝑛 𝑖𝑛 𝑎 𝑠𝑝𝑒𝑐𝑖𝑓𝑖𝑐 𝑓𝑒𝑑𝑒𝑟𝑎𝑙 𝑐𝑜𝑢𝑟𝑡 𝑜𝑣𝑒𝑟 𝑎 𝑔𝑖𝑣𝑒𝑛 𝑡𝑦𝑝𝑒 𝑜𝑓 𝑐𝑎𝑠𝑒 𝑖𝑠 𝑑𝑒𝑝𝑒𝑛𝑑𝑒𝑛𝑡 𝑢𝑝𝑜𝑛 𝑎𝑢𝑡ℎ𝑜𝑟𝑖𝑡𝑦 𝑒𝑥𝑝𝑟𝑒𝑠𝑠𝑙𝑦 𝑐𝑜𝑛𝑓𝑒𝑟𝑟𝑒𝑑 𝑏𝑦 𝑠𝑡𝑎𝑡𝑢𝑡𝑒. 

The Court held that, although some orders may be appealable under the authority of 18 U.S.C. 1291, this order in this case lacked such authority. The Circuit Court was reversed and remanded.

References

External links
 

1957 in United States case law
United States Supreme Court cases
United States Supreme Court cases of the Warren Court